Near the middle of the squamous part of occipital bone is the external occipital protuberance, the highest point of which is referred to as the inion. The inion is the most prominent projection of the protuberance which is located at the posterioinferior (rear lower) part of the human skull. The nuchal ligament and trapezius muscle attach to it.

The inion (ἰνίον, iníon, Greek for the occipital bone) is used as a landmark in the 10-20 system in electroencephalography (EEG) recording. Extending laterally from it on either side is the superior nuchal line, and above it is the faintly marked highest nuchal line.

A study of 16th-century Anatolian remains showed that the external occipital protuberance statistically tends to be less pronounced in female remains.

Additional images

See also
 Internal occipital protuberance
 Occipital bun

References

External links

 
 https://web.archive.org/web/20071223042432/http://www.upstate.edu/cdb/grossanat/hnsklatob1.shtml

Bones of the head and neck